Palestine competed at the 2004 Summer Olympics in Athens, Greece, from 13 to 29 August 2004.

The Palestine Olympic Committee listed Sofia Sakorafa, a Greek-born former javelin world record holder who had recently obtained Palestinian citizenship, as part of its delegation. The International Olympic Committee, however, barred Sakorafa from competing, due to her failing to meet the qualifying standard.

Athletics

Palestinian athletes have so far achieved qualifying standards in the following athletics events (up to a maximum of 3 athletes in each event at the 'A' Standard, and 1 at the 'B' Standard).

Men

Women

Swimming

Men

See also
 Palestine at the 2002 Asian Games
 Palestine at the 2004 Summer Paralympics

References

External links
Official Report of the XXVIII Olympiad
Palestine Olympic Committee 

Nations at the 2004 Summer Olympics
2004
Summer Olympics